"Oh How She Changed" is a song by English band Strawbs written by Dave Cousins and Tony Hooper. It was the first single to be released by Strawbs and later appeared on their 1969 album Strawbs. An alternative mix of the song appears on the 2006 box set A Taste of Strawbs and a re-working on 2009's Dancing to the Devil's Beat.

B-Side

The B-side track "Or Am I Dreaming", written by Dave Cousins, also appeared on the album Strawbs.

Personnel

Dave Cousins – vocals, acoustic guitar
Tony Hooper – vocals, acoustic guitar, percussion
Ron Chesterman – double bass

Release history

External links
 Lyrics to "Oh How She Changed" at Strawbsweb official site
 Lyrics to "Or Am I Dreaming" at Strawbsweb official site

References
"Oh How She Changed" at Strawbsweb official site
Strawbs at Strawbsweb official site

Strawbs songs
1968 debut singles
Songs written by Dave Cousins
Songs written by Tony Hooper
Song recordings produced by Gus Dudgeon
1968 songs
A&M Records singles